A grism (also called a grating prism) is a combination of a prism and grating arranged so that light at a chosen central wavelength passes straight through. The advantage of this arrangement is that one and the same camera can be used both for imaging (without the grism) and spectroscopy (with the grism) without having to be moved. Grisms are inserted into a camera beam that is already collimated. They then create a dispersed spectrum centered on the object's location in the camera's field of view.

The resolution of a grism is proportional to the tangent of the wedge angle of the prism in much the same way as the resolutions of gratings are proportional to the angle between the input and the normal to the grating.

The dispersed wavefront sensing system (as part the NIRCam instrument) on the James Webb Space Telescope uses grisms. The system allows coarse optical path length matching between the different mirror segments.

See also
 Diffraction grating
 Echelle grating
 Slitless spectroscopy

References

Kitchin, C. R.: Astrophysical Techniques. CRC Press 2009.
Space Telescope Science Institute
Lesson on Spectrograph

Prisms (optics)
Diffraction
Diffraction gratings